Woinarski may refer to:

 Mount Woinarski, Antarctica
 Brian Woinarski (born 1930), Australian rules footballer
 Casimir Zichy-Woinarski (1864–1935), Australian lawyer and judge
 Gertrude Mary Zichy-Woinarski (1874-1955), Australian welfare worker
 John Woinarski (active from 2001), Australian ornithologist

See also